Marian Shockley (also Marian Shockley Collyer) (October 10, 1908 – December 14, 1981) was an American film actress of the 1930s.

Early years
Born in Kansas City, Missouri, Marian Shockley (sometimes known as Marion Shockley) attended the University of Missouri with plans to teach history. However, her experiences with the Theatre Guild and in stock theater turned her attention to acting.

Career
Shockley was selected as a "WAMPAS Baby Star" in 1932, alongside Ginger Rogers and Gloria Stuart, among others. From 1930 to 1934 she starred in nineteen films, all B-movies, including the 1931 western Near the Trails End opposite Bob Steele, and, that same year, Heroes of the Flames starring opposite Tim McCoy.

Fourteen young women were selected as "WAMPAS Baby Stars" in 1932. Of those, several saw continued success in acting, whereas others would see short lived success, then watch their acting career end with little notoriety. Shockley would be in the latter group. She continued auditioning for parts, receiving only one between 1934 and 1943. She played a small role in Stage Door Canteen (1943). She would have a couple of television roles following that.

Shockley's Broadway credits include Abie's Irish Rose (1936) and Dear Old Darling (1935).

On radio, Shockley was the first person to play Nikki Porter, Ellery Queen's secretary, in The Adventures of Ellery Queen, filling that role from 1939 to 1944. In 1939, she married the program's producer-director, George Zachary. She also portrayed Carol Brent on Road of Life.

Personal life
Marian retired from acting in 1955. She was a sister-in-law to Stuart Erwin and actress June Collyer. She was married to Gordon Barry Thomson from 1934 to 1938, George Zachary from 1939 to ca.1945, and actor Bud Collyer from 1946 until his death in 1969, Collyer already had three children from a previous marriage.  She died on December 14, 1981, aged 73.

References

External links

Actor profile at Ellery Queen, a website on deduction 

1911 births
1981 deaths
Actresses from Kansas City, Missouri
American film actresses
American television actresses
20th-century American actresses
WAMPAS Baby Stars